Macromphalina floridana is a species of very small sea snail, a marine gastropod mollusk in the family Vanikoridae.

Description 
The maximum recorded shell length is 3.1 mm.

Habitat 
The minimum recorded depth for this species is 1 m; maximum recorded depth is 34.5 m.

References

Vanikoridae
Gastropods described in 1965